Teree Sang is a 2009 Hindi coming of age romantic film directed by Satish Kaushik, starring Ruslaan Mumtaz (previously seen in MP3: Mera Pehla Pehla Pyaar) and Sheena Shahabadi in her first role. Teree Sang explores the issue of teen pregnancy.

Plot
Maahi Puri (Sheena Shahabadi) is a 15-year-old girl who is the only child of a high-class family. Kabir (Ruslaan Mumtaz) is a 17-year-old from a lower-middle-class family. As they become friends, they are attracted to each other's lives. Their friendship and intimacy grows day by day. On a camping trip on New Year's Eve, the young couple have sex and Maahi becomes pregnant. Both sets of parents oppose her going through the pregnancy, and the young couple run away together. Maahi refuses to have an abortion. Kabir and Maahi's friends take them to an abandoned cottage, where they stay to protect their unborn child.

The four worried parents have no other choice than to team together and find their children. Kabir's parents overhear his friends talking about where he might be, and go look for them. Meanwhile, Kabir finds a job in construction site then gas delivery to earn money to support his family. Maahi keeps the house clean, makes dinner every day, and secretly sells fruit.

When the parents find the two, the young couple try to flee. Catching up with them, the parents realize they are allies. While all six are traveling together in a bus, Maahi goes into labour. The group takes Maahi to a hospital where she gives birth to a boy.

A lawyer fights the case about teen pregnancy, and Kabir is charged. Having come to agree to the couple's relationship, Maahi's father opposed the lawyer. Kabir is sentenced 3 months' remand.

Cast
 Ruslaan Mumtaz as Kabir Punjabi "Kuku"
 Sheena Shahabadi as Maahi Puri Punjabi
 Satish Kaushik as Narender Punjabi, Kabir's father
 Sushmita Mukherjee as Sushma Punjabi, Kabir's mother
 Rajat Kapoor as Barrister Mohit Puri, Maahi's father 
 Neena Gupta as Paaki Puri, Maahi's mother
 Sooraj Puri as Kabir's friend
 Anupam Kher as Judge, Special Appearance
 Paramjyot Singh
 Gaurav Mendiratta as supporting actor

Soundtrack
The soundtrack album has eight songs composed by Sachin–Jigar, Anu Malik and Bappi Lahiri. All lyrics written by Sameer and Virag Mishra.

Track listings

Box office
The film received a range of responses. Some people have welcomed the new thinking about young people having babies. Preity Zinta, starring Kya Kehna, was the first to explore this. Kya Kehna was another film on this topic, which became a superhit.

References

External links
 

2009 films
2009 romantic comedy-drama films
Films scored by Anu Malik
Teenage pregnancy in film
2000s Hindi-language films
Films scored by Bappi Lahiri
Films directed by Satish Kaushik
Indian romantic comedy-drama films
Indian coming-of-age comedy-drama films
2000s coming-of-age comedy-drama films
Sony Pictures films
Columbia Pictures films
Sony Pictures Networks India films